Chen Bang-yen is a Taiwanese mathematician who works mainly on differential geometry and related subjects. He was a University Distinguished Professor of Michigan State University from 1990 to 2012. After 2012 he became University Distinguished professor emeritus.

Biography

Chen Bang-yen (陳邦彦) is a Taiwanese-American mathematician. He received his  B.S. from Tamkang University in 1965 and his M.Sc. from National Tsing Hua University in 1967.  He obtained his Ph.D. degree from University of Notre Dame in 1970 under the supervision of Tadashi Nagano.

Chen Bang-yen taught at Tamkang University between 1966 and 1968, and at the National Tsing Hua University in the academic year 1967–1968. After his doctoral years (1968-1970) at University of Notre  Dame, he joined the faculty at Michigan State University as a research associate from 1970 to 1972, where he became associate professor in 1972, and full professor in 1976. He was presented with the title of  University Distinguished Professor in 1990. After 2012 he became University Distinguished Professor Emeritus.

Chen Bang-yen is the author of over 500 works including 12 books, mainly in differential geometry and related subjects. His works have been cited over 30,000 times.

On October 20–21, 2018, at the 1143rd Meeting of the American Mathematical Society held at Ann Arbor, Michigan, one of the Special Sessions was dedicated to Chen Bang-yen's 75th birthday.
 The volume 756 in the Contemporary Mathematics series, published by the American Mathematical Society, is dedicated to Chen Bang-yen, and it includes many contributions presented in the Ann Arbor event. The volume is edited by Joeri Van der Veken, Alfonso Carriazo, Ivko Dimitrić, Yun Myung Oh, Bogdan Suceavă, and Luc Vrancken.

Research contributions
Given an almost Hermitian manifold, a totally real submanifold is one for which the tangent space is orthogonal to its image under the almost complex structure. From the algebraic structure of the Gauss equation and the Simons formula, Chen and Koichi Ogiue derived a number of information on submanifolds of complex space forms which are totally real and minimal. By using Shiing-Shen Chern, Manfredo do Carmo, and Shoshichi Kobayashi's estimate of the algebraic terms in the Simons formula, Chen and Ogiue showed that closed submanifolds which are totally real and minimal must be totally geodesic if the second fundamental form is sufficiently small. By using the Codazzi equation and isothermal coordinates, they also obtained rigidity results on two-dimensional closed submanifolds of complex space forms which are totally real.

In 1993, Chen studied submanifolds of space forms, showing that the intrinsic sectional curvature at any point is bounded below in terms of the intrinsic scalar curvature, the length of the mean curvature vector, and the curvature of the space form. In particular, as a consequence of the Gauss equation, given a minimal submanifold of Euclidean space, every sectional curvature at a point is greater than or equal to one-half of the scalar curvature at that point. Interestingly, the submanifolds for which the inequality is an equality can be characterized as certain products of minimal surfaces of low dimension with Euclidean spaces.

Chen introduced and systematically studied the notion of a finite type submanifold of Euclidean space, which is a submanifold for which the position vector is a finite linear combination of eigenfunctions of the Laplace-Beltrami operator.

In Riemannian geometry, Chen and Kentaro Yano initiated the study of spaces of quasi-constant curvature. Chen also introduced the δ-invariants (also called Chen invariants), which are certain kinds of partial traces of the sectional curvature; they can be viewed as an interpolation between sectional curvature and scalar curvature. Due to the Gauss equation, the δ-invariants of a Riemannian submanifold can be controlled by the length of the mean curvature vector and the size of the sectional curvature of the ambient manifold. Submanifolds of space forms which satisfy the equality case of this inequality are known as ideal immersions; such submanifolds are critical points of a certain restriction of the Willmore energy.

Publications
Major articles
 Chen Bang-yen and Koichi Ogiue. On totally real submanifolds. Trans. Amer. Math. Soc. 193 (1974), 257–266.  
 Chen Bang-yen. Some pinching and classification theorems for minimal submanifolds. Arch. Math. (Basel) 60 (1993), no. 6, 568–578.  
Surveys
 Chen Bang-yen. Some open problems and conjectures on submanifolds of finite type. Soochow J. Math. 17 (1991), no. 2, 169–188.
 Chen Bang-yen. A report on submanifolds of finite type. Soochow J. Math. 22 (1996), no. 2, 117–337.
 Chen Bang-yen. Riemannian submanifolds. Handbook of Differential Geometry, Vol. I (2000), 187–418. North-Holland, Amsterdam.  ;  
Books
 Chen Bang-yen. Geometry of submanifolds. Pure and Applied Mathematics, No. 22. Marcel Dekker, Inc., New York, 1973. vii+298 pp.
 Chen Bang-yen. Geometry of submanifolds and its applications. Science University of Tokyo, Tokyo, 1981. iii+96 pp. 
 Chen Bang-yen. Finite type submanifolds and generalizations. Università degli Studi di Roma "La Sapienza", Istituto Matematico "Guido Castelnuovo", Rome, 1985. iv+68 pp.
 Chen Bang-yen. A new approach to compact symmetric spaces and applications. A report on joint work with Professor T. Nagano. Katholieke Universiteit Leuven, Louvain, 1987. 83 pp.
 Chen Bang-yen. Geometry of slant submanifolds. Katholieke Universiteit Leuven, Louvain, 1990. 123 pp.  
 Chen Bang-yen and Leopold Verstraelen. Laplace transformations of submanifolds. Centre for Pure and Applied Differential Geometry (PADGE), 1. Katholieke Universiteit Brussel, Group of Exact Sciences, Brussels; Katholieke Universiteit Leuven, Department of Mathematics, Leuven, 1995. x+126 pp.
 Chen Bang-yen. Pseudo-Riemannian geometry, δ-invariants and applications. With a foreword by Leopold Verstraelen. World Scientific Publishing Co. Pte. Ltd., Hackensack, NJ, 2011. xxxii+477 pp. .  
 Chen Bang-yen. Total mean curvature and submanifolds of finite type. Second edition of the 1984 original. With a foreword by Leopold Verstraelen. Series in Pure Mathematics, 27. World Scientific Publishing Co. Pte. Ltd., Hackensack, NJ, 2015. xviii+467 pp. .  
 Chen Bang-yen. Differential geometry of warped product manifolds and submanifolds. With a foreword by Leopold Verstraelen. World Scientific Publishing Co. Pte. Ltd., Hackensack, NJ, 2017. xxx+486 pp. 
Ye-Lin Ou and Chen Bang-yen. Biharmonic submanifolds and biharmonic maps in Riemannian geometry. World Scientific Publishing Co. Pte. Ltd., Hackensack, NJ, 2020. xii+528 pp.

References

Mathematicians from Michigan
20th-century Taiwanese mathematicians
Taiwanese emigrants to the United States
21st-century Taiwanese mathematicians
Differential geometers
Tamkang University alumni
National Tsing Hua University alumni
University of Notre Dame alumni
Michigan State University faculty
1943 births
Living people
Academic staff of Tamkang University
People from Toucheng, Yilan County, Taiwan
People with acquired American citizenship
Academic staff of the National Tsing Hua University